
Year 1507 (MDVII) was a common year starting on Friday (link will display the full calendar) of the Julian calendar.

Events 

 January–June 
 April 25 – Martin Waldseemüller publishes his Cosmographiae Introductio ("Introduction to Universal Cosmography") and accompanying wall map, the first to show the Americas as a separate continent, naming them in honour of Amerigo Vespucci, his friend and idol.
 April / May – Martin Luther is ordained a priest of the Catholic Church.
 October – The Portuguese conquer the island of Ormuz in the Persian Gulf.

 Date unknown 
 The Timurid Dynasty ends, when Uzbeks under Muhammad Shaybani capture the capital, Herat, and Emir Badi' al-Zaman Mirza flees.
 The Portuguese occupy Mozambique, and the islands of Socotra and Lamu.
 The Portuguese found the town of Stone Town in Mozambique.
 Cardinal Cisneros is appointed major inquisitor of Castile.
 King Henry VII of England prosecutes lords for keeping private armies, which might threaten his régime.
 King James IV grants a patent for the first printing press in Scotland, to Walter Chapman and Andrew Myllar.
 Raphael paints The Deposition, among other works.
 The Aztec New Fire ceremony is held for the last time (according to Bernardino de Sahagún).

Births 

 January 1 – Anna of Brandenburg, Duchess of Mecklenburg-Güstrow (d. 1567)
 January 14
 Catherine of Austria, Queen of Portugal (d. 1578)
 Luca Longhi, Italian painter (d. 1580)
 January 25 – Johannes Oporinus, Swiss printer (d. 1568)
 February 11 – Philip II, Metropolitan of Moscow, Russian Orthodox monk (d. 1569)
 February 21 – James, Duke of Rothesay, Scottish prince (d. 1508)
 March 7 – Magdalena of Saxony (d. 1534)
 March 25 – Thomas White, English politician (d. 1566)
 March 29 – Henry II, Duke of Münsterberg-Oels and Count of Glatz (d. 1548)
 April 13 – Konrad Hubert, German theologian and hymnwriter (d. 1577)
 May 9 – Tijmen Groenewegen, Dutch politician
 June 5 – Ferdinand of Portugal, Duke of Guarda and Trancoso, Portuguese nobleman (d. 1534)
 June 6 – Annibale Caro, Italian poet and Knight of Malta (d. 1566)
 June 25 – Marie of Baden-Sponheim, duchess consort of Bavaria (d. 1580)
 July 25 – Chamaraja Wodeyar IV, King of Mysore (d. 1576)
 August 2 – William Waldegrave, English Member of Parliament (d. 1554)
 August 15 – George III, Prince of Anhalt-Dessau, German prince (d. 1553)
 September 16 – Jiajing Emperor of China (d. 1567)
 September 27 – Guillaume Rondelet, French physician (d. 1566)
 October 1
 Johannes Sturm, German educator (d. 1589)
 Giacomo Barozzi da Vignola, Italian architect (d. 1573)
 October 4 – Francis Bigod, British noble (d. 1537)
 October 19 – Viglius, Dutch politician (d. 1577)
 October 26 – Alvise I Mocenigo, Doge of Venice (d. 1577)
 October 29 – Fernando Alvarez de Toledo, Spanish general (d. 1582)
 November 25 – Joos de Damhouder, Belgian jurist (d. 1581)
 December 18 – Ōuchi Yoshitaka, Japanese warlord (d. 1551)
 date unknown
 Bálint Bakfark, Hungarian composer (d. 1576)
 Sir Ralph Sadler, English statesman (d. 1587)
 probable
 Jacques Arcadelt, Franco-Flemish composer (d. 1568)
 Inés Suárez, Spanish conquistadora (d. 1580)
 possible
 Anne Boleyn, second queen of Henry VIII of England (b. this year or 1501; d. 1536)

Deaths 

 January 17 – Henry IV of Neuhaus (b. 1442)
 March 12 – Cesare Borgia, Italian general and statesman. (b. 1475)
 March 21 – Jan Feliks "Szram" Tarnowski, Polish nobleman (b. 1471)
 April 1 – Sigismondo d'Este, Italian nobleman (b. 1433)
 April 2 – Francis of Paola, Italian founder of the Order of the Minims (b. 1416)
 July 5 – Crinitus, Italian humanist (b. 1475)
 July 8 – Anna Notaras, Byzantine noblewoman (b. 1436)
 July 29 – Martin Behaim, German navigator and geographer (b. 1459)
 August 15 – John V, Duke of Saxe-Lauenburg (b. 1439)
 August 23 – Jean Molinet, French writer (b. 1435)
 August 24 – Cecily of York, English princess (b. 1469)
 December – Ingeborg Tott, influential Swedish noblewoman, spouse of Swedish regent Sten Sture the elder
 Date unknown:
 Agnes Jónsdóttir, Icelandic abbess (b. year unknown)

References